The great-billed mannikin or grand munia (Lonchura grandis) is a species of estrildid finch found in northern and eastern New Guinea. It is found in wetlands habitat. The status of the species is evaluated as Least Concern.

References

BirdLife Species Factsheet

great-billed mannikin
Birds of New Guinea
great-billed mannikin
Endemic fauna of New Guinea